The term Full Gospel or Fourfold Gospel is a theological doctrine used by some evangelical denominations that summarizes the Gospel in four aspects, namely salvation, sanctification, divine healing and second coming of Christ.

Doctrine 
This term has its origin in 1887 in a series of sermons called "Fourfold Gospel" by the pastor Albert Benjamin Simpson, founder of the Alliance World Fellowship in New York, United States, which characterize his teaching. According to him, this concept represents the 4 aspects of the ministry of Jesus Christ; Christ the Savior, Sanctifier, Healer and King who will soon return.

History 
In October 1922, the evangelist Aimee Semple McPherson, founder of Foursquare Church, used the expression "Foursquare Gospel" referring to the doctrine in a sermon in Oakland, California, and stated that it will be the center of her teaching.

Various other Pentecostal denominations have been influenced by this doctrine which will be called the "Full Gospel".  A variety of Pentecostals have further developed the motif of the full gospel, predominantly the five-fold theme of salvation, sanctification, Spirit baptism, divine healing, and the coming kingdom.

See also

 Full Gospel Baptist Church Fellowship
 Full Gospel Business Men's Fellowship International
 Christian and Missionary Alliance
 International Church of the Foursquare Gospel
 List of Pentecostal and Full Gospel Churches
 Full Gospel Assemblies
 Assemblies of God
 Charismatic Movement
 Pentecostalism
 Spiritual healing
 Glossolalia

References

Evangelical theology